Brian Barry-Murphy (born 27 July 1978) is an Irish professional football manager and former player who played as a defensive midfielder in the Football League.

He began his career at his hometown club Cork City. In 1999, he moved to English club Preston North End, but began to establish himself in league football with loan spells at Southend United and Hartlepool United. He would go on to play for Sheffield Wednesday, and Bury before signing for local rivals Rochdale in 2010.

Barry-Murphy has played internationally for the Republic of Ireland twice at under-21 level.

Early life
Barry-Murphy was born in Cork. His father, Jimmy, was a Gaelic footballer and hurler, and manager, who is widely considered to be one of the most iconic players in the history of Gaelic games.

Club career
Brian Barry-Murphy has previously played for Cork City, Preston North End and Sheffield Wednesday as well as representing the Republic of Ireland at Under 21 level. He also had loan spells at Southend United and Hartlepool United. It was at Southend in which he scored his first goal in English football in a game against Leyton Orient. He scored the 1,000th goal for Bury in Tier 4 of the English Football League in a 2–2 draw with Wrexham. This made them the first club to score 1,000 goals in all four tiers of the league.

Rochdale
On 16 June 2010 Barry-Murphy agreed terms with Rochdale and signed a four-year contract in July. He scored his first and only goal for Rochdale in a 3–1 defeat at MK Dons on 5 November 2011. Barry-Murphy was club's first team coach, as well as retaining his registration as the club's senior outfield player.

Managerial career
Barry-Murphy was appointed Rochdale's caretaker manager in March 2019 following the sacking of Keith Hill. In April 2019 he was appointed permanent manager on a two-year contract. On 30 June 2021, Barry-Murphy resigned from his position as manager.

On 24 July 2021, Barry-Murphy was announced as the manager of the Manchester City Elite Development Squad.

Managerial statistics

References

External links

1978 births
Living people
Association footballers from Cork (city)
Brian
Republic of Ireland association footballers
Republic of Ireland under-21 international footballers
Association football midfielders
Cork City F.C. players
Preston North End F.C. players
Southend United F.C. players
Hartlepool United F.C. players
Sheffield Wednesday F.C. players
Bury F.C. players
Rochdale A.F.C. players
League of Ireland players
English Football League players
Republic of Ireland football managers
Rochdale A.F.C. managers
English Football League managers
Rochdale A.F.C. non-playing staff
Manchester City F.C. non-playing staff